Hablas (also Romanized as Hāblas) is a village in Piran Rural District, in the Central District of Piranshahr County, West Azerbaijan Province, Iran. At the 2006 census, its population was 38, in 6 families.

References 

Populated places in Piranshahr County